Callophrys spinetorum, the thicket hairstreak, is a butterfly of the family Lycaenidae. It was described by William Chapman Hewitson in 1867. It is found in North America from British Columbia through the Rocky Mountains to New Mexico and Mexico and through California to Baja California. The habitat consists of pinyon-juniper forests, mixed woodlands, and coniferous forests.

The wingspan is 25–32 mm. The upperside is steel blue and the underside reddish brown. The hindwings with a white postmedian band which forms a W shape near the tail. Adults are on wing from May to August in one generation per year. They feed on flower nectar.

The larvae feed on Arceuthobium species.

Subspecies
Callophrys spinetorum spinetorum (California, Colorado)
Callophrys spinetorum millerorum Clench, 1981 (New Mexico)

References

External links

Butterflies described in 1867
Callophrys
Butterflies of North America
Taxa named by William Chapman Hewitson